Strmaševo is an abandoned village at the southernmost part of the municipality of Demir Kapija, North Macedonia. It was equal in size and close to Dračevica.

Demographics
According to the 2002 census, the village had a total of 0 inhabitants.

See also
 Demir Kapija municipality

References

Sources 
Demir Kapija: From Prehistory to Today , p 97-8

Villages in Demir Kapija Municipality